Neossos nidicola, is a European species of Heleomyzidae.

References

Heleomyzidae
Diptera of Europe
Insects described in 1930
Taxa named by Richard Karl Hjalmar Frey